KD Transportation group (KD Group,) is a transportation company based on Daewon Passenger Traffic, mainly does bus transportation. Company focuses on intercity bus, airport bus, transit bus, tour bus service, and is biggest bus company in South Korea. This company's all airport bus, intercity bus, tour bus' color is Purple.

Gallery

References

External links 
 

Bus companies of South Korea
South Korean companies established in 1972
Transport companies established in 1972